Maneo Refiloe Mohale is a queer South African Black feminist writer, editor, and poet. They have written for various local and international publications including Jalada, Prufrock, The Beautiful Project, The Mail & Guardian and spectrum.za. Their debut collection of poetry Everything is a deathly flower was published in September 2019 with uHlanga press. In 2020, Mohale was shortlisted for the  Ingrid Jonker Poetry Prize, making them the youngest finalist of that year.

Life 
Maneo Mohale was born in 1992 in Benoni, South Africa.  They hold a Bachelor of Arts degree (Honours) in History and International Relations from the University of British Columbia, Vancouver, Canada.

After living in Canada for 5 years, they now live in Johannesburg working as a writer and editor.

Work 
Mohale's work engages with the topics of race, media, queerness, survivorship, language and history. Their undergraduate thesis at the University of British Columbia was titled A Dance in the Rain: Race, Resistance and Media in Apartheid South Africa. In their time in university, Mohale was introduced to arts journalism when they  co-founded an online student journalism platform called The Talon in 2014.

References

External links 
 Maneo Mohale, Mohale's website

South African poets
Feminist writers
Living people
1992 births
People from Benoni
University of British Columbia alumni
People from Johannesburg
Queer feminists
Queer writers